Norman Johansen (March 9, 1914 – May 4, 2009) was an American football player, coach, and athletic director. He served as the head football coach at Wartburg College in Waverly, Iowa from 1952 to 1964, compiling a record of 53–54–4. Johansen was the athletic director at Northern Arizona University in Flagstaff, Arizona from 1970 to 1974.

References

1914 births
2009 deaths
Northern Arizona Lumberjacks athletic directors
Northern Iowa Panthers football players
Wartburg Knights football coaches
People from Clinton, Iowa
Players of American football from Iowa